Norlén or Norlen is a surname. Notable people with the surname include: 

Alison Norlen (born 1962), Canadian artist
Andreas Norlén (born 1973), Swedish politician
Göran Norlén (1931-2020), Swedish speedway rider
Henrik Norlén (born 1970), Swedish actor